Joel Rosario (born January 14, 1985) is a Champion jockey in American Thoroughbred horse racing, originally from the Dominican Republic. In the space of five weeks in 2013 he rode the winners of the Dubai World Cup and the Kentucky Derby. More recently, he rode Knicks Go to wins in the Pegasus World Cup, Whitney Stakes, and Breeders' Cup Classic in 2021.

Career
On December 11, 2009, Rosario equaled a Hollywood Park Racetrack record when he won six races on a single race card. Previously, the feat had been achieved by Hall of Fame jockeys Bill Shoemaker (1953, 1970), Laffit Pincay, Jr. (1968), and Kent Desormeaux (1992).

On March 30, 2013 Rosario won what was then the world's richest horse race, the US$10 million Dubai World Cup at Meydan Racecourse in Dubai, aboard the US-based stallion Animal Kingdom.  The same year, on May 4, 2013 he won the Kentucky Derby aboard the colt Orb.  On June 20, 2013 Rosario won the Norfolk Stakes aboard No Nay Never at Royal Ascot, and broke the 5 furlong track record for two-year-olds.  In 2014, he won the Belmont Stakes on Tonalist. In April 2015, he surpassed 2,000 career wins.

On November 13, 2020, Rosario won his 3,000th career race aboard Hit the Woah at Aqueduct Racetrack.

Year-end charts

References

 Joel Rosario at the NTRA 

1985 births
Living people
American jockeys
Sportspeople from Santo Domingo
Dominican Republic sportspeople
Dominican Republic emigrants to the United States